Chain Lakes Provincial Park is a provincial park located in the foothills of the Rocky Mountains west of Nanton, Alberta, Canada. It was established along the Chain Lakes Reservoir. The Cowboy Trail runs along the eastern boundary of the park. The park is located 1 1/2 hours southeast of Calgary and about the same distance from Lethbridge to the southeast.

Facilities and activities
Chain Lakes Provincial Park is open year-round and offers camping and day use facilities. Camping facilities include individual sites with power and a group camp large enough for about 15–20 recreational vehicles and tents. Day use facilities include picnic tables and heated kitchen shelters.

Year-round fishing is a popular activity. The reservoir is regularly stocked with lake trout. A number of walking trails of various lengths and levels are located throughout the park.

See also

List of Alberta provincial parks
List of Canadian provincial parks
List of National Parks of Canada

External links

 Alberta Community Development - Chain Lakes Provincial Park

Provincial parks of Alberta
Municipal District of Ranchland No. 66